John Boland may refer to:
 John E. Boland (1937–2015), American politician
 John J. Boland (1875–1956), co-founder of the American Steamship Company
 John J. Boland (1953 ship), third freighter operated by the American Steamship Company to be named after its co-founder
 John J. Boland (1973 ship), fourth freighter operated by the American Steamship Company to be named after its co-founder
 John Boland (Fine Gael politician) (1944–2000), Irish Fine Gael politician
 John Boland (author) (1913–1976), British novelist
 John Boland (Irish nationalist politician) (1870–1958), Member of Parliament and Olympic tennis champion
 John P. Boland (priest) (died 1968), labor priest, Buffalo, New York
 J. Kevin Boland (born 1935), Roman Catholic bishop, Diocese of Savannah, Georgia
 John Boland (chemist), Irish chemist